The Solstice Cyclists (also known as The Painted [Naked] Cyclists of the Solstice Parade, or The Painted Cyclists) is an artistic, non-political, clothing-optional bike ride  celebrating the Summer Solstice. It is the unofficial start of the Summer Solstice Parade & Pageant, an event produced by the Fremont Arts Council in the Fremont district of Seattle.

The event was started by streakers who crashed the parade. The first people to do so were a small group of friends and roommates from the adjacent (Wallingford) neighborhood, several of whom were bicycle couriers by trade. Participants now emphasize bodypainting and other artistry. The group is the largest and fastest growing ensemble associated with the parade. The parade, put on by Fremont Arts Council, is held on a Saturday close to the actual solstice.

Art bikes are common and cycles include BMX bikes, cycle rickshaws, unicycles, clown bicycles, tall bikes, lowrider bicycles, tandem bicycles and tricycles. People come from all over the country to ride. Full and partial (especially topfree) nudity is popular, but not mandatory.

While cyclists open the parade, they are not in the parade line-up (except in 2003 when they had a float). Parade rules say "any printed communications, written words, recognizable logos, signage, leaf-letting, or advertising in any form are prohibited on the parade route."

Recent events include a pre-ride bodypainting party, a party ride through the city, and the parade itself at noon.

Controversy
2001 and subsequent years were controversial for the naked cyclists, including references to them as "parade crashers".  In 2001, police and organizers posted laws against indecent exposure to warn of possible prosecution. Organizers claimed cyclists were getting in the way of the event's artistic freedom.

"Here in the self-anointed center of the universe, where the Waiting for the Interurban sculptures wear more clothing than the nude cyclists who grace the annual Solstice Parade, high-tech is moving in."

"Meanwhile, Hadrann says the scent of rebellion is in the air in Fremont - or maybe it's just another rumor. 'Some people in the community are going to get nude if he (Sidran) starts arresting the cyclists,' he says. ... 'First, there was 50, now there's like 100 people. . . . Who knows what kind of chain reaction this is going to bring.'"  This article also includes Seattle Police Department Lt. Mark Kuehn's suggestions for safety for nude cyclists such as: "Refrain from trying out saddles in the nude, for obvious sanitary reasons. Hadrann suggests shoppers take along a few pairs of Chinese disposable underwear (made of paper) for saddle-buying expeditions."

"The council decided this week against posting 'no nudity' signs for the neighborhood's arts parade, where two men were arrested for naked bike riding last year. Police had asked that the signs be posted for this year's parade, set for Saturday. ...Council President Bradley Erhlich said the public nudity might be a form of artistic expression. ... 'If it is art, then the Arts Council should support them,' Erhlich said. ... Crowds booed when last year's naked riders were arrested and handcuffed."

2000
In the nude cyclists' ninth year, bodypainting artist Steven Bradford joined the bodypainting team and assisted in transforming 4 women into Fire, Earth, Air, and Water at the painting party at Fire's home.

2001
In 2001, according to The Seattle Times, there were 50 cyclists, mostly in bodypaint. To the amusement of many, this year an artist had a painting in the parade showing a naked female bicyclist next to a baton-wielding police officer. The pose itself could have either shown the apprehension or the cop gleefully stopping for a picture next to the bicyclist. The panel was put on a small platform on wheels and parade goers were invited to have their pictures taken with their heads poking out of the holes of the naked bicyclists and the officer.

In 2001, the city threatened to withdraw the event permit for the Fremont Arts Council because of the nudity. Signs were actually made warning naked cyclists that they may be subject to arrest. The city ended up backing off before the event day. Fremont Arts Council parade organizers urged riders to participate within the artistic spirit of the event. Many locals were very upset that the city would threaten to arrest one of the parade's most popular and creative ensembles. The blowback effect, as predicted by Seattle City Council Chair Nick Licata, ended up being more publicity and popularity for the cyclists which, in turn, led to more cyclists wanting to join the ensemble.

In efforts to combat this effect, the Seattle City Council was invited by the Fremont Arts Council to participate in the parade. Nick Licata was the only one who agreed and ended up cycling through as the "un-naked cyclist". After jeers of "Take your clothes off" he was met by a parade monitor who told him to get off the parade route, stating "Yeh? We still don't have bike riding in the parade. If one person rides then others will and then the whole parade will have bikes riding all over the place."  Licata later lamented in a Seattle Times article, "I was waving to the photographer - smack in the middle of a pack of painted, naked bicyclists."

"There was no better illustration of the fair's quirkiness than in its parade - with its wild costumes, floats and giant puppets - and nude bicyclists, which led to a flap over the permit for this year's parade. ... Before the city issued this year's parade permit, police said they have gotten numerous complaints about the nude cyclists every year. They asked the Fremont Arts Council to post signs along the parade route warning cyclists, who are not a sanctioned part of the parade, about laws against indecent exposure. The council said no, even though members discouraged the nudity. ... In 1998, two bikers in the buff were arrested. None were arrested this year."

2002
"What solstice is complete without nude cyclists? To get your annual fix, see the Fremont Summer Solstice Parade and Fair on Saturday and Sunday."

"As has been the tradition, a number of unauthorized naked bicycle riders start the parade. Last year there were 50 — most in body paint."

2003
2003 marked the twelfth year of naked cyclists taking part in the Solstice Parade.  The parade took place on June 21, 2003. Numbers quadrupled from previous years to between 75 and 80 riders. An internet discussion forum was established for the first time. The bodypainting party took place at the host's house in the Ravenna neighborhood, with a photo shoot at Cowen Park. The procession then began south through the University District on Roosevelt and then on 45th through Wallingford to Phinney Ridge. This is also the first year that the cyclists were officially part of the parade with their Helios-themed float, which several cyclists (partially dressed) climbed aboard after they cycled through the parade. The float featured wispy clouds and gold-painted "chariot" exercise bikes to evoke a sense of pulling the sun through the summer. Ironically, toward the end of the parade, and despite all the "Happy Solstice" chants, the sky clouded over and it began to rain. Two digital video films were produced from footage of this year's event. One is called Naked & Painted: The Fremont Solstice Riders 2003 and is sold to friends and future potential riders with proceeds going to a local charity. The other video was called Solstice: A Celebration of the Art of Bodypainting produced by James W. Taylor/Circle Rock Productions and premiered at Naked Freedom Film Festival , held at the Seattle Art Museum on May 15, 2004. Unusually cool weather this year resulting in a number of weather-themed paint jobs.

Also in 2003, much publicity was focused on David Zaitzeff's determination to walk naked through the Solstice Parade. Zaitzeff sued Seattle police Chief Gil Kerlikowske in a federal lawsuit because he "desires to go nude at the Fremont Solstice Parade without fear of unjust arrest". U.S. District Judge Robert Lasnik said that because Zaitzeff had not been arrested for indecent exposure, the court couldn't make a prospective ruling on the matter.

Much later in the year there was a suggestion to have the group become part of a larger international naked bike ride, later known as the World Naked Bike Ride (WNBR). The idea was unpopular because the Solstice Parade, unlike WNBR, is a non-political arts event. Secondary reasons for not liking the idea included that WNBR would not be as spontaneous of an event and some may not be as inclined to participate in an artistic way.

2004
The parade took place on June 19, 2004. About 116 cyclists participated, setting a new record. The main group started to ride from the pre-parade bodypainting party at the old Segway building in Ballard. (The building was later demolished to make way for Ballard Civic Center Park.) The ride proceeded down NW Market Street to Leary Way to the parade. The cyclists did not have a float in the parade in 2004, but there were more elaborate art installations on bikes. 2004 also marked the beginning of the Synchronised Cycling Drill Team within the group. The year's theme was Noah's Ark animals. One of the cyclists provided rides to children along the parade route in her cycle rickshaw.

A week prior to the event, on June 12, was the first annual World Naked Bike Ride Seattle event and was the first time a major naked cycling event has crossed the channel into downtown Seattle. This ride featured a pre-ride bodypainting party at Gas Works Park, where the end of the painted cyclists ride traditionally took place.

2005

 
The parade took place on June 18, 2005. Approximately 138 cyclists leave bodypainting party on the south side of the Lake Washington Ship Canal, and once joined by those waiting at the parade, the numbers probably grew to around 160 cyclists. Part of the ride included going down the Ballard Bridge on 15th Avenue and turning again on NW Market Street. About five cyclists broke off from the group after the end of the parade ride and rode around Green Lake and came back to Fremont.

One of the big controversies in 2005 was the Fremont Arts Council excluding People Undergoing Real Experiences (PURE) (now known as Pure cirkus) from dressing "up as pirates with two people suspended on a pirate ship float from hooks in their skin" as they go through the parade. Much of the media noted that while the naked cyclists are tolerated and widely popular, this has become the new controversial area for the council.

A week later, a third painted ride, called the Body Pride Ride, was started by one of the painted cyclists, and took place for the first time in the Seattle Gay Pride Parade on Capitol Hill. A WNBR mini-ride in September marked 2005 as a record-setting year not only for the number of painted cyclists participating, but also for doubling the number of painted naked rides in Seattle to a total of four.

"If bike riders rode nude in a Los Angeles summer solstice celebration, the LAPD would shoot them dead, after a 'slow speed' chase televised on all 28 local channels."

"Really, that's just the crazy naked bicyclists who precede the parade every year. They get all the press, all the hype, all the lasting impressions. People who work on the parade openly despise them. ... The nude bikers take away from all the legitimate art that volunteers spend countless hours creating. With one exhibitional blow, months of hard work by solstice parade artists is knocked from our collective conscious."

2006
The 18th Annual Summer Solstice Parade & Pageant, on June 17, 2006, marked the 15th year that naked cyclists have participated in the parade. On March 27, 2006, the Painted Cyclists went public with a public portal website: The Painted Cyclists. KUOW-FM in Seattle did an interview for their program called Weekday with the cyclists at the Ballard neighborhood where the bodypainting party was taking place, taking up at least three residential lots. The interview was reportedly about cycling safety in Seattle. This is confirmed by several cyclists and pictures taken at the bodypainting party. The segment aired on June 22, 2006.

2007
The 19th Annual Solstice Parade took place on June 16, 2007, marking the sixteenth consecutive year the painted cyclists have ridden in the parade. 267 cyclists took to the streets at 11:45 a.m. with little or no confrontation, legal or otherwise. The annual painting party took place at a nearby residence on NW 48th Street in Ballard. For the first time, a video presented by a painted inline skater was shot at the painting party and posted to the website of The Stranger newspaper.

2008
The 20th Annual Solstice Parade took place on June 21, 2008, marking the 17th consecutive year that the painted cyclists have accompanied. Slightly fewer cyclists than in previous years rode, and tension between both the Seattle police and the Fremont Arts Council was minimal. The painting party took place this time in Belltown, meaning the cyclists had to ride a full three miles through the Seattle neighborhood of Queen Anne to get to Fremont. Painting parties were also going on independently of the main party downtown, so riders had to coordinate meeting up at a common location before entering the parade. After making a surprise entrance by entering through the crowd at the middle of the parade route, on Fremont Avenue (which had never been done before), riders were initially rerouted because of the timing of the permits. They later reentered the parade route closer to the traditional starting point and proceeded through the parade, ending the ride at Gas Works Park.

2009
The 21st Annual Solstice Parade took place on June 20, 2009, marking the 18th consecutive year of the painted cyclists.  The painting party took place at Hale's Ales in Ballard, and attracted an estimated 430 cyclists, plus painters.  After riding through Ballard and watching their numbers swell as riders from independent paint parties joined the group, the riders traversed the parade route in Fremont, ending once again at Gas Works Park.  Media coverage included an article and video by the Seattle P-I. Ensembles included the "Stimulus Package" group, appropriate for a year of controversial economic bailouts. This year was also the first year of the Gardens Everywhere Bike Parade.

2010
The 22nd Annual Solstice Parade took place on Saturday, June 19, 2010, marking the nineteenth consecutive year of the painted (and some not-so-painted) solstice cyclists.  The painting party again took place at Hale's Ales in Ballard, and attracted hundreds of cyclists, plus painters.  Then they jumped on their bikes and headed to Ballard for a warm-up ride in the relatively chilly mid-50s air, surprising unsuspecting drivers and whooping it up down Market Street before returning for the noon start of the parade, where the riders completed the parade route in Fremont. An optional repeat loop-back plan through part of the route was added in 2010, designed to extend the experience for both the riders who opted for it as well as the crowd lining the streets, with a side benefit of minimizing any time gap between the end of the cyclists and the start of the parade proper.  That plan met with some confusion due to communication issues with parade officials, and therefore mixed results, but riders vowed to remedy that in 2011.  The cyclists ended at the now-traditional clothing-optional "victory celebration" at and around Kite Hill in Gas Works Park.

2011

The parade took place on June 18, the day before Fathers Day. The skies were overcast and the temperature was in the mid-50s with intermittent misty light rain—for the second year in a row, the third Saturday in June was unseasonably cool. But that did not deter the 600+ riders nor curb their enthusiasm. For many, the day started at the old Ballard Library building, which had been rented as the central location for body painting. Earlier in the week, plastic had been laid on the floor and taped into one big surface, then tables set out to delineate separate painting areas. Aisles were painted on the floor in orange with "Keep Clear" to keep the fire marshal happy and facilitate movement around the area; bumping into someone covered in paint leaves a mark. In the northwest corner was the film crew for Beyond Naked, a documentary about four first time riders.

The parade riders gathered in the parking lot next to the library awaiting the go-ahead for the trip through Ballard. Most participants shivered in the cold while logistics were confirmed. Then, off through Ballard, to the amazement of unsuspecting pedestrians, many whooping and hollering encouragement. From there the parade snaked through Fremont in a circuitous route, getting longer at each pass, until it finally ended at Gas Works Park.

2012
The solstice cyclists rode for the 21st consecutive year, starting out by hosting their painting party at the Old Ballard Library, on NW 57th St. and 24th Avenue (the same place as the previous year). The weather was overcast with temperatures in the 60's.

2013
After a morning paint party at a marine hangar in Seattle's Shilshole neighborhood, hundreds of cyclists and skaters rode through Ballard, pausing for a group photo at Ross Park, before entering the parade course in Fremont at 2:45 pm. For the first time in several years the weather was hot and sunny, and as a result the crowd watching the parade was especially dense, and the number of participants was much larger than in previous years, with estimates ranging from several hundred to 1000.

2015
A small group of longtime organizers once again hosted a mass paint party in the Silshole neighborhood.  The organizers took a video of the painted cyclists heading out through the gate and counted well over 945 cyclists just at this paint party. En route to the parade starting point they were joined by hundreds of other painted cyclists who swelled the ranks at each passing intersection . The artistry displayed on  naked riders' bodies has become more and more intricate each year with some riders bringing their own personal painters to the party.  Donations were collected at the entrance and after all expenses were paid the paint party volunteers donated $4,500 to the Fremont Art Council in order to help pay the parade expenses.

2016
In the weeks prior to the parade this year there was some friction between the Fremont Arts Council, the official parade organizers, and the cyclist organizers, a non-hierarchical consensus group that comes together once a year and has no formal organization. The FAC wanted the cyclists to become official members of the parade and under their control. The cyclist group are basically anarchists in the way they operate and refused.  They agreed to disagree and things went on as usual with close cooperation between the two groups.
The numbers dwindled this year as the day dawned cold and damp.  A seasoned group of 10 volunteers once again opened the gates to the large, group paint party at a private marina in the 4100 block of Shilshole Ave. N.W. At an entry portal donations were taken and only people who were cyclists to be painted or their painters  were allowed to enter. Over several hours 600 clothed cyclists entered and at noon 600 cold (but exuberant) painted naked cyclists exited. The group rode through the Ballard neighborhood and then on to the Fremont Solstice Parade route where they were joined by approximately 100 more painted cyclists from private paint parties.  After subtracting expenses, the  organized paint party group was able to donate $2,000 to the Fremont Arts Council to help defray the parade costs the following spring.

2019
The warm and sunny weather brought over 700 people to the main cyclist paint party this year. As in past years, the painted, naked (mostly) cyclists filed out of the boat marina in the Ballard neighborhood and did a  ride through the streets of the Ballard neighborhood. As the riders entered the parade route, prior to the start of the actual parade, they were not allowed to circulate on the route as had been arranged beforehand with the official Fremont Solstice Parade organizers. Instead they were forced to ride straight through the route with no slow looping back as had become the custom and agreed upon pattern for many years.  This left the artists who had spent hours painting, and those who had come to view the parade and the cyclists with a less than satisfactory experience. The alliance between the free-spirited biking artists and the Fremont Arts Council who holds the permit for the actual parade is rapidly fraying at the edges and the outcome remains to be seen. The cyclist paint party group donated $4,000 to the Fremont Arts Council to help toward the cost of the parade.

2020 and 2021
There was no parade either year due to COVID-19, but a small group of cyclists met up at Gasworks Park and rode through the city.

See also

References

External links

 

Culture of Seattle
Festivals in Seattle
Fremont, Seattle
Naked cycling events
Pacific Northwest art
Clothing-optional events
Unofficial observances